Givi Toidze (18 December 1932 – 10 February 2022) was a Georgian artist and painter, Honored Artist of the Georgian SSR (1967), People's Artist of the Georgian SSR (1988), Honorary Citizen of Tbilisi (1999), and Secretary of the Artists' Union of Georgia.

Life and career
In 1960, Givi graduated from the Tbilisi State Academy of Arts and then was a professor at the same academy for many years.

He participated in exhibitions since 1961. Notable among his works are "Winter", "Fishermen", "Khevsureti", "Mtatusheti", "Old Tbilisi" and "Narikala". His works are preserved in museums such as Tretyakov Gallery (Russia), Museum of the Peoples of the East (Russia), and Peter Ludwig Gallery (Germany). His paintings have been collected by George W. Bush, Jacques Chirac, and other notables.

Toidze died on 10 February 2022, at the age of 89.

Awards
 1981 — Shota Rustaveli Prize
 1967 — Honored Artist of the Georgian SSR

References

External links 
 Givi Toidze
 Международная художественная выставка педагогов-художников «Древняя Иверия»
 Biographical Dictionary of Georgia
 Givi Toidze’s Anniversary Retrospective Exhibition

1932 births
2022 deaths
Artists from Tbilisi
20th-century painters from Georgia (country)